The 2022 Columbus Challenger was a professional tennis tournament played on indoor hard courts. It was the eleventh edition of the men's tournament which was part of the 2022 ATP Challenger Tour. It took place in Columbus, United States between January 24 and 30 2022.

Champions

Singles

  Yoshihito Nishioka def.  Dominic Stricker 6–2, 6–4.

Doubles

 Tennys Sandgren /  Mikael Torpegaard def.  Luca Margaroli /  Yasutaka Uchiyama 5–7, 6–4, [10–5].

Singles main draw entrants

Seeds

 1 Rankings are as of January 17, 2022.

Other entrants
The following players received entry into the singles main draw as wildcards:
  Jack Anthrop
  Alexander Bernard
  Jenson Brooksby

The following player received entry into the singles main draw using a protected ranking:
  Wu Tung-lin

The following players received entry from the qualifying draw:
  Sebastian Fanselow
  Nick Hardt
  Ryan Harrison
  Nicolás Mejía
  Roberto Quiroz
  Yosuke Watanuki

References

ATP Columbus Challenger
2022 in sports in Ohio
January 2022 sports events in the United States